The following is a list of notable events and releases of the year 1992 in Norwegian music.

Events

April
 10 – The 19th Vossajazz started in Voss, Norway (April 10 – 12).

May
 20 – The 20th Nattjazz started in Bergen, Norway (May 20 – 31).

June
 27 – The 23rd Kalvøyafestivalen started at Kalvøya near by Oslo (June 27 – 28).

Unknown date
 The band Storytellers was initiated.

Albums released

Unknown date

B
 Jon Balke
 Nonsentration (ECM Records) with Oslo 13

G
 Jan Garbarek
 Ragas and Sagas (ECM Records) with Ustad Fateh Ali Khan and Musicians from Pakistan

Deaths

 March
 27 – Harald Sæverud, composer (born 1897).
 28 – Elisabeth Granneman, singer, songwriter, children's writer and actress (born 1930).

 August
 3 – Finn Ludt (73), pianist and harpsichordist, best known as an organist (born 1918).

Births

 January
 17 – Kristian B. Jacobsen, jazz bassist and composer.
 20 – Anders Eikås, rock drummer of Honningbarna (died 2012).

 March
 6 – Lukas Zabulionis, jazz saxophonist and composer.
 15 – Elisabeth Lid Trøen, jazz saxophonist and composer.

 April
 6 – Mathias Stubø, electronica artist and DJ.

 May
 9 – Ingrid Søfteland Neset, classical flautist.
 25 – Krissy Matthews, blues rock singer, songwriter and guitarist.

 September 
 9 – Frida Amundsen, singer and songwriter.

 Unknown date
 Siril Malmedal Hauge, jazz singer, composer and band leader.

See also
 1992 in Norway
 Music of Norway
 Norway in the Eurovision Song Contest 1992

References

 
Norwegian music
Norwegian
Music
1990s in Norwegian music